Udayan Thakkar (Gujarati: ઉદયન ઠક્કર) is a Gujarati language poet, writer and translator from Mumbai, India.

His first anthology of poems is Ekavan (1987) which won him Jayant Pathak Poetry Prize. Sellara (2003), his second anthology, was awarded the Ushnas Prize (2002–03). His other significant works include Jugalbandhi (1995) and Udayan Thakker Na Chuntela Kavyo (2012; Selected poems of Udayan Thakker). He contributed to Gujarati children's literature. He is an editor of online poetry portal Poetry India.

Early life 
Thakker was born on 28 October 1955 in Mumbai, India to Karsandas and Shantiben. His grandfather was a native of Kutch. He started to write poems during his primary education.

He completed his SSC from The New Era School, Mumbai. He completed his Bachelor of Commerce from Sydenham College.

Career 
He is a Chartered accountant and Cost accountant by qualification.In 1974 his poem came out for the first time in Kavita, a bimonthly Gujarati poetry journal. Subsequently, his poems appeared in Gujarati literary magazines including Shabdasrishti, Kavilok, Etad, Samipe, Gazalvishwa and Navneet Samarpan.

Works 
Ekavan, his first anthology of poems, was published in 1987, followed by Sellara (2003) and Udayan Thakker Na Chuntela Kavyo (2012). His poems have been translated into Japanese and English language and been published as a book.

His works in children's literature include En Milake Ten Milake Chhoo, Tak Dhina Dhin and Haak Chhi Hippo.

Recognition 
His poetry collection Ekavan (1987) was awarded by Jayant Pathak Poetry Award of 1987-88 and also prescribed as a textbook by SNDT Women's University. He won Ushnas Prize (2002–03) for his book Sellara (2003). He is a recipient of Harindra Dave Memorial Award and Best Book Prize of 2003 instituted by Gujarat Sahitya Akademi. In 2019, he received the Kalapi Award given by Indian National Theatre.

Personal life 
He married Rajul in 1984 and they have two daughters, Richa and Garima.

See also 
 List of Gujarati-language writers

References

External links
 
 Poetry India

Modernist writers
1955 births
Living people
Writers from Mumbai
Gujarati-language writers
Gujarati-language poets
Indian male poets